Duke of Francavilla is a hereditary title in the Peerage of Spain, accompanied by the dignity of Grandee and granted in 1555 by Charles I to Diego Hurtado de Mendoza, Viceroy of Aragon and Catalonia and son of Cardinal Mendoza.

The title makes reference to the town of Francavilla Fontana in the former Kingdom of Naples, at the time a part of the Spanish Empire.

Dukes of Francavilla (1555)

Diego Hurtado de Mendoza y de la Cerda, 1st Duke of Francavilla
Ana Hurtado de Mendoza y de Silva, 2nd Duchess of Francavilla
Diego Gómez de Silva y Hurtado de Mendoza, 3rd Duke of Francavilla
Rui Gómez de Silva y Mendoza, 4th Duke of Francavilla 
Rodrigo Díaz de Vivar y De Silva, 5th Duke of Francavilla
Gregorio María de Silva y Mendoza, 6th Duke of Francavilla
Juan de Dios de Silva y Haro, 7th Duke of Francavilla
María Teresa de Silva y Gutiérrez de los Ríos, 8th Duchess of Francavilla
Pedro de Alcántara Álvarez de Toledo y Silva, 9th Duke of Francavilla
Pedro de Alcántara Álvarez de Toledo y Salm-Salm, 10th Duke of Francavilla
Pedro de Alcántara Téllez-Girón y Beaufort Spontin, 11th Duke of Francavilla
Mariano Téllez-Girón y Beaufort Spontin, 12th Duke of Francavilla
Manuel Álvarez de Toledo y Lasparre, 13th Duke of Francavilla 
Iñigo de Arteaga y Falguera, 14th Duke of Francavilla
Jaime de Arteaga y Martín, 15th Duke of Francavilla

See also
List of dukes in the peerage of Spain
List of current Grandees of Spain

References 

Dukedoms of Spain
Grandees of Spain
Lists of dukes
Lists of Spanish nobility